Want Want China Holdings Ltd. is a subsidiary of Want Want Holdings Limited (Want Want; Chinese: 旺旺集團有限公司; pinyin: Wàngwàng Jítuán Yǒuxiàn Gōngsī). It is one of the largest rice cracker and flavored drink manufacturer in the world. It engages in the manufacturing, distribution and sale of snacks, beverages and other products. In addition to working alongside 9,000 distributors, it has more than 400 sales office and employs more than 50,000 people.

History
In 1962, Want Want began operations in the name of I Lan Foods Industrial Company Limited (宜蘭食品工業股份有限公司) in Yilan County, Taiwan, which manufactured canned food. It was founded by Tsai Eng-meng's father, Jonathan Shuai Qiang Ng.

Tsai Eng-meng took over his father's food business at the age of 19 and came up with a new product—crackers made from rice flour.[6]

1983, it collaborated with Iwatsuka Confectionery Company Limited, one of the top three Japanese rice cracker makers, to develop a rice cracker market in Taiwan. In return, Iwatsuka obtained 5% of the common stock of the company.[7] In 2009, Iwatsuka's share in Want Want was valued at about US$350M, nearly three times as much as Iwatsuka's own market value of US$125M.[8]

1992, established the first Mainland China factory and sales office in Changsha, Hunan.

1996, China and was listed on the Singapore Stock Exchange under the name Want Want Holdings Pte Ltd.

2000, headquarter relocated to Shanghai, China.

2007, Want Want Holdings Pte Ltd was delisted from the Singapore Stock Exchange.[9]

2008, the holding company of our food and beverage business - Want Want China Holdings Limited, was listed on the Main Board of the Hong Kong Stock Exchange.[10][11] HKEX STOCK CODE 0151. 2011, Want-Want China Holdings Ltd. was ranked one of the top choice of stocks to buy on the Hang Seng index.
 
2009, Want Want purchased China Times, China Television (CTV) and CtiTV.[12]

2014, Want Want China Holdings Ltd. won the Largest Food and Beverage Enterprise Award in the Global Top 1000 Chinese Entrepreneurs by Asia Business Week. President Tsai Eng-Meng was ranked Top 100 CEO appraised by Harvard Business Review Magazine.

2015, Want Want China Holdings Chief Operating Officer, Matthew Tsai, was honored with the "Chinese F&B Association of Science and Technology Innovation Award: Notable Youth Award." Want Want proudly obtains the title of "Consumer's Favorite Brand of 2015" for both the food industry and beverage industry.
 
2020, Want Want China Holdings Ltd.  was selected as one of top 20 International Company Brands in Taiwan for 12 consecutive years. Established a food and beverage factory in Vietnam in an effort to increase global presence in South East Asian market.

As of November 29, 2021, Want Want China Holdings Ltd. has a market value of more than $10B USD and distributing to North America, South America, Europe, Africa, Asia and Australia.

Hot-Kid
Hot-Kid (Chinese: 旺仔 Pinyin: Wàng Zǎi) is the logo and mascot of Want Want which represents the spirit of Want Want.

Food Divisions
Want Want China Holdings Ltd. has 24 product portfolio’s and developed more than 1000 SKU’s.

1.	Rice Cracker

2.	Milk Beverages

3.	Mr. Bond (Coffee & Milkshake series)

4.	Specialized Drinks

5.	Ball Cake

6.	Chewy Milk Candy

7.	Gummy

8.	Queen Alice (Liquid Filled Gummy)
 
9.	Beans & Peanuts

10.	Fried Snacks

11.	Extruded Snacks

12.	Seafood Snacks

13.	Cake & Cookies

14.	Jelly

15.	Rice Noodles

16.	Alcohol

17.	Mr. Hot (Spicy Snack Series)

18.	Fix Body (Healthy Line Series)

19.	 Cold-Chain

20.	Ice Products

21.	Gift Packs

22.	Bulk Packaging

23.	Baby Products

24.	Elderly Snacks

Special Editions 

 Ethnic series of hot-kid milk drinks: since there are fifty-six ethnic groups in China, Want Want designs fifty-six figures of Hot-Kid wearing representative costumes of each ethnic group.
 Career series of hot-kid milk drinks: Want Want designs twenty-five occupations for Hot-Kid, including eighteen regular occupations such as chef, nurse, and reporter, and seven hidden figures of emerging occupations such as e-sports player, comedian, and rapper.

Philosophy
The Group embraces its management philosophy of “People-oriented, Self-confidence and Unity” in pursuit of the goal of being “a comprehensive food and beverage kingdom” and “No.1 in China, No.1 in the World”.

Co-branding 

 Clothing: TYAKAHSHA x Want Want
 Milk Tea:
 LELECHA x Want-Want Ball Cake
 NAYUKI x Want Want
 Nowwa Coffee x Want-Want Queen Alice
 Make-up: CHANDO x Want Want
 Celebrity: TEAM WANG design x Want-Want Rice Cracker
 Music: NetEase Cloud Music x Want Want

Factory Recognition

All Want Want products went through Quality Control Circle (QCC) and World Class Manufacturing (WCM) practices that are implemented across all factories; continuous improvement activities focusing on the quality, efficiency, energy, cost, innovation, environment, safety and other aspects in order to gain market competitiveness and ensure premium quality.

Want Want has worked with multiple organization to receive recognitions for their factory line. FSSC 22000, ISO22000, BRCGS, HACCP, KOSHER, NON-GMO, NOP, MUI HALAL, ECOCERT, USDA Organic, are a few of certifications that was received. Furthermore, Want Want worked closely alongside each local Food and Drug Authority (FDA) organization in their respected countries and oblige to their rules and requirements.

In June 2020, Want Want’s Guangzhou production base was awarded 6 BRCGS Grade A certificates. As a GFSI-approved standard, the BRCGS standard has been one of the international benchmarks of food safety management system.

Social Contributions 

 Besides food, the business of Want Want covers media, pension, real estate, hospitals, hotels, furniture, and even chicken farms.
 After the outbreak of COVID-19 in Wuhan in early 2020, Hunan Want Want Hospital not only became the designated hospital for the pandemic but also sent dozens of medical personnel to support Wuhan. Want Want Food Wuhan Branch also donated tens of thousands of boxes of Want Want products to various epidemic prevention centers.
 Want Want attaches great importance to the development of social welfare. There is a Want Want China Foundation which has donated tens of millions of RMB to disaster areas after a series of natural disasters such as Wenchuan earthquake and Yushu earthquake.

References

External links
Want Want China Holdings Limited
 Wang Zai Milk

Former companies in the Hang Seng Index
Companies listed on the Hong Kong Stock Exchange
Chinese companies established in 2007
Food and drink companies of China
Food and drink companies of Taiwan
Manufacturing companies based in Shanghai
Food and drink companies established in 2007
Civilian-run enterprises of China